Ghaniaan is a village and Union council of  Phalia Tehsil, Mandi Bahauddin District, Punjab, Pakistan. It is located at N 32°40'29 & E 73°64'96 with an altitude of 201 metres above sea level and lies about 8 km North West of Phalia on the Phalia-Alipur Chatha road near Chenab River Qadirabad Headworks. The nearest police station is Phalia Police Station, which is about 7.5 km to the North west. Population of village is round about 10000. Like other villages

Overview
Ghaniaan has all basic facilities including hospital, schools, telephones and good roads with transport to the nearest city Phalia. Most of the people are farmers by profession; but, since few years, a number of people have been employed in European and Gulf countries, which has raised people's life style. There are two main crops, rice and wheat. Local farmers earn good money from 'Colonel Basmati' brand rice. The literacy rate is also going up, specially in women. The people from Ghaniaan like many others have contributed their part at international level in the fields of engineering and medicine, etc.

Geography 
The coordinate are N 32°40'29 & E 73°64'96. With an altitude of 201 metres above sea level and lies about 8 km North West of Phalia on the Phalia-Alipur Chatha road near Chenab River Qadirabad Headworks.

Education
 Government boys High school
 Government girls High school
 Govternment primary school Thatti Bawa

References
 Zahid Imran Numberdar Masters in Pol science and B.ED
 

Villages in Mandi Bahauddin District
Union councils of Mandi Bahauddin District
Villages in Phalia Tehsil